Gimjang, also spelled kimjang, is the traditional process of preparation and preservation of kimchi, the spicy Korean fermented vegetable dish, in the wintertime. During the summer months, kimchi is made fresh, from seasonal vegetables. For one month, starting from the tenth month of the year, people prepare large quantities of kimchi, to provide nutrition throughout winter.

Gimjang was listed as a UNESCO Intangible Cultural Heritage in December 2013 and the 133rd Korean Intangible Cultural Property.

Customs

Kimchi can be eaten as an accompaniment to almost any meal and is an important part of Korean culture. Recipes date back to at least the 13th century, when it was made from vegetables, pickles, and either salt or a mixture of alcohol and salt. Red pepper was added to the ingredients in the 17th century. Modern-day kimchi is typically made from napa cabbage and white radish, although there are hundreds of variations; it may also contain turnip, leek, carrots, and garlic.

In the cooler weather of November, there are many crops in the fields and market-places, and the Gimjang process begins. The labour-intensive task is shared by families, relatives, and neighbours. Groups of Korean people gather to cut the vegetables, wash them, and add salt to cure the food and begin the fermentation process. The nature of kimchi means that it is challenging to store for long periods; if it is too cold, it will freeze, and if it is too warm, it will over ferment, and may turn sour. The traditional solution prior to effective modern refrigeration is to store kimchi in earthenware jars in the ground, buried up to the neck level of the jar to prevent the contents from freezing. As the temperature falls below 0 °C, fermentation is halted and the food is preserved; it begins again as the temperature increases in spring time.

The strong odors of kimchi can taint other products in a refrigerator. Despite modern advances in refrigeration, the custom of gimjang continues to be passed down the generations. It is common in cities for people to store large jars of fermenting kimchi on balconies. It is also increasingly common to own and use secondary refrigerators designed specifically for storing kimchi.

In an attempt to combat the increasing popularity of mass-produced kimchi, which is convenient for modern life, Seoul has created the world's only kimchi museum, where tourists and local people can sample different types of the fermented dish, and learn about the traditional gimjang process. Although consumption figures have fallen, Koreans still consume  of Kimchi per head each year.

References

농과대학 응용식물학부 원예학전공 시설원예학ㆍ채소원예 김장 설명

Traditions
Korean cuisine
Food preservation
Food preparation techniques
Intangible Cultural Heritage of Humanity
Important Intangible Cultural Properties of South Korea